The 1988 Dwars door België was the 43rd edition of the Dwars door Vlaanderen cycle race and was held on 24 March 1988. The race started and finished in Waregem. The race was won by John Talen.

General classification

References

1988
1988 in road cycling
1988 in Belgian sport
March 1988 sports events in Europe